Stickens is a townland in the Roman Catholic parish of Caragh in Co. Kildare, Ireland.  It is part of the Donore Electoral Division.

Stickens is located a quarter of a mile past the village of Caragh when travelling north-west on the R409.  The townland is situated to the left of the road, and is accessed by a cul de sac which is entered onto by taking the first left turn having travelled past the church in Caragh village. 

On some historical records the spelling "Stickins" appears; however, this version is infrequently used.  There is debate regarding the origin of the name of the townland.  One possible source is the old English word "stoc" which means wooden defence.

Townlands of County Kildare